Slo Light is the debut studio album by English musician, composer, and record producer Neil Davidge, under the name Davidge. The album was released on 25 February 2014, and was produced by himself. This album marks the first studio album of Neil Davidge, after several years working as a film score composer and record producer, best known as Massive Attack's producer. The album was recorded in Christchurch Studios, which is known for the collaboration of Massive Attack and Davidge studios and the recording of the 90's one of the most anticipated album, Mezzanine. Former Strangelove's vocalist and guitarist Patrick Duff was also collaborated for the music and the lyrics.

The album provided 3 singles. The first single is "Slo Light", which was released on 3 December 2013. The second single is "Sleepwalking" , released on 20 February 2014, five days before the album came out. The third single is "Riot Pictures" which was released on 7 October 2014. This album was followed by the film score with the same title, which was produced by Davidge and released in 2015. The album was met with generally positive reviews from music critics.

Track listing
All songs were written by Neil Davidge and Patrick Duff

References 

2014 debut albums